La Bastide or Labastide (a fortified town) is the name or part of the name of many communes in France:

 La Bastide, former commune of the Aveyron department, now part of Mur-de-Barrez
 La Bastide, former commune of the Dordogne department, now part of Monestier, Dordogne
 La Bastide, Pyrénées-Orientales, in the Pyrénées-Orientales
 La Bastide, Var, in the Var
 La Bastide-Capdenac, former commune of the Aveyron department, now part of La Rouquette
 La Bastide-Clairence, in the Pyrénées-Atlantiques
 La Bastide-de-Besplas, in the Ariège
 La Bastide-de-Bousignac, in the Ariège
 La Bastide-de-Lordat, in the Ariège
 La Bastide-d'Engras, in the Gard
 La Bastide-de-Sérou, in the Ariège
 La Bastide-des-Fonts, former commune of the Aveyron department, now part of Cornus, Aveyron
 La Bastide-des-Jourdans, in the Vaucluse department
 La Bastide-du-Salat, in the Ariège department
 La Bastide-l'Évêque, in the Aveyron department
 La Bastide-Louquié, former commune of the Aveyron department, now part of Cantoin
 La Bastide-Nantel, former commune of the Tarn-et-Garonne department, now part of Castanet, Tarn-et-Garonne
 La Bastide-Paréage, former commune of the Aveyron department, now part of Saint-Just-sur-Viaur
 La Bastide-Pradines, in the Aveyron department
 La Bastide-Puylaurent, in the Lozère department
 La Bastide-Solages, in the Aveyron department
 La Bastide-sur-l'Hers, in the Ariège department
 La Bastide-Teulat, former name of the commune of La Bastide-Solages (Aveyron)

Labastide
 Labastide, in the Hautes-Pyrénées department
 Labastide-Beauvoir, in the Haute-Garonne department
 Labastide-Castel-Amouroux, in the Lot-et-Garonne department
 Labastide-Cézéracq, in the Pyrénées-Atlantiques department
 Labastide-Chalosse, in the Landes department
 Labastide-Clermont, in the Haute-Garonne department
 Labastide-d'Anjou, in the Aude department
 Labastide-d'Armagnac, in the Landes department
 Labastide-de-Lévis, in the Tarn department
 Labastide-Dénat, in the Tarn department
 Labastide-de-Penne, in the Tarn-et-Garonne department
 Labastide-de-Virac, in the Ardèche department
 Labastide-du-Haut-Mont, in the Lot department
 Labastide-du-Temple, in the Tarn-et-Garonne department
 Labastide-du-Vert, in the Lot department
 Labastide-en-Val, in the Aude department
 Labastide-Esparbairenque, in the Aude department
 Labastide-Gabausse, in the Tarn department
 Labastide-Marnhac, in the Lot department
 Labastide-Monréjeau, in the Pyrénées-Atlantiques department
 Labastide-Murat, in the Lot department
 Labastide-Paumès, in the Haute-Garonne department
 Labastide-Rouairoux, in the Tarn department
 Labastide-Saint-Georges, in the Tarn department
 Labastide-Saint-Pierre, in the Tarn-et-Garonne department
 Labastide-Saint-Sernin, in the Haute-Garonne department
 Labastide-Savès, in the Gers department
 Labastide-sur-Bésorgues, in the Ardèche department
 Labastide-Villefranche, in the Pyrénées-Atlantiques department

See also
 Bastide (disambiguation)